Sarab Ghazanfar (also Romanized as Sarāb Ghaẕanfar, Sarāb-e Ghazanfar, and Sarāb Ghazanfar) is a village in Khaveh-ye Shomali Rural District, in the Central District of Delfan County, Lorestan Province, Iran. At the 2006 census, its population was 1,871, in 424 families.

References 

Towns and villages in Delfan County